The 2016–17 St. Francis Brooklyn Terriers men's basketball team represented St. Francis College during the 2016–17 NCAA Division I men's basketball season. The Terrier's home games were played at the Generoso Pope Athletic Complex. The team has been a member of the Northeast Conference since 1981. They were coached by Glenn Braica who was in his seventh year at the helm of the Terriers. They finished the season 4–27, 2–16 in NEC play to finish in last place. It was the first time since the 1993–94 season that the Terriers finished ranked 10th in the NEC. It also represents the second consecutive losing season for the Terriers and the first season in Braica's tenure that the Terriers missed the NEC postseason.

Previous season 
The Terriers finished the 2015–16 season 5–17, 11–7 in NEC play to finish in a three-way tie for second place. They lost in the quarterfinals of the NEC tournament to Mount St. Mary's.

Preseason
The Terriers lost five players to graduation; guard Tyreek Jewell, forward Chris Hooper, guard Miles Rockafeler,  forward Antonio Jenifer and forward Amdy Fall. All, with the exception of Rockafeler, played significant roles for the Terriers last season. Jewell was the leading scorer, Fall and Jenifer were the leading rebounders and Hooper was a potent force off the bench averaging 11.5 ppg. The Terriers also lost 2 players to transfers; Marlon Alcindor and Jonathan Doss. It was also announced that native Icelander Dagur Kár Jónsson left the team in October to return to Iceland and play professionally.

As of May the Terriers have added four players to their roster; Rasheen Dunn, Gianni Ford, Darelle Porter Jr. and Robert Montgomery Jr. The Terriers also have two players, Jahmel Bodrick and Cori Johnson, which were enrolled at St. Francis College during the 2015–2016 season but were academically ineligible to play, and are now joining the team as Redshirt Freshman. Prior to the beginning of the season, it was announced that Cori Johnson suffered a knee injury that will require season ending surgery.

Dunn, the 6'2" guard helped lead Thomas Jefferson to their first PSAL Class AA championship in 62 years and the program's first state federation title this past season.  Dunn averaged 16.0 points, 5.0 rebounds, and 4.0 assists, and was named the Co-MVP after scoring 23 points in the title game at Madison Square Garden.
Ford, at 6'1" he averaged 18.8 points, 4.5 rebounds, and 4.1 assists during his senior year at Boys & Girls this past season. He is regarded as one of the top shooters in the New York City and increased his production to 25.0 ppg. during the PSAL playoffs.  
Porter, at 6'5" he averaged 11.5 points and shot 46.3 percent from the floor this past season at Polk State College.  He also grabbed 135 rebounds, shot 83.5 percent from the foul line, and was named a First Team All Suncoast Conference selection.  
Montgomery, the 6'6" forward produced 13.2 points, 10.0 rebounds, and 1.5 blocks per game at Mount Zion Prep in Baltimore, Maryland this past season.
Johnson, the 6'9" center averaged 12.7 points and 10.8 rebounds per game as a senior at South Shore High School in 2014–2015   
Bodrick, at 6'6" he averaged 18.0 points and 7.0 rebounds as a senior at Our Savior Lutheran in 2014–2015

Departures

Incoming transfers

Class of 2016 signees

Roster

Schedule and results

|-
!colspan=12 style=| Non-conference regular season
  

  

  
|-
!colspan=12 style=| NEC regular season

Season statistics

Awards and honors
Rasheem Dunn
NEC men's basketball Rookie of the Week award (December 12, 2016 – December 18, 2016). Dunn posted team-highs with 13 points and four assists at Albany on December 17, 2016.
NEC men's basketball Rookie of the Week award (December 26, 2016 – January 1, 2017). Dunn averaged 21.5 points, 6.5 rebounds and 3.5 assists on the week as he helped lead the Terriers to two victories.
NEC men's basketball Rookie of the Week award (January 23, 2017 – January 29, 2017). Dunn averaged 15.5 points, 7.5 rebounds, 5.0 assists, 3.0 steals and committed just one turnover 77 minutes of play against Fairleigh Dickinson and Wagner.
Selected to the 2016–17 NEC men's basketball All-Rookie team

See also
2016–17 St. Francis Brooklyn Terriers women's basketball team

References

St. Francis Brooklyn Terriers men's basketball seasons
Saint Francis Brooklyn
Saint Francis Brooklyn Terriers men's basketball
Saint Francis Brooklyn Terriers men's basketball